Zalesie Gorzyckie  is a village in the administrative district of Gmina Gorzyce, within Tarnobrzeg County, Subcarpathian Voivodeship, in south-eastern Poland.

The village has a population of 180.

References

Zalesie Gorzyckie